An incident weapon is typically an anti-vehicle device intended to inflict disabling damage or prevent escape without killing the vehicle operators. Incident weapons were used by military personnel during the Cold War to discourage clandestine use of submarines within territorial waters without causing casualties which might escalate into warfare.

Historical use
The Baltic Sea was a vital access route for Soviet shipping to reach the Atlantic Ocean. Both Warsaw Pact and NATO had a strategic interest in possible blockades of that access. The western shore of the Baltic is controlled by neutral Sweden. Swedish submarine incidents occurred as foreign submarines explored Swedish territorial waters to assess the feasibility of evading future blockading warships and naval mine fields.

Examples
The United States developed a modified Hedgehog projectile substituting a magnet and clapper for the explosive charge. If the magnet stuck to the submarine hull, flow along the hull as the submarine moved through the water caused the clapper to oscillate hammering against the hull. Sweden deployed several incident weapons in 1983 to discourage such exploration after  ran aground while exploring Swedish waters in 1981.

Elma
Elma was a small bomb intended to be dropped by aircraft or ships in patterns similar to Hedgehog. If one of these bombs landed on the submerged submarine, a magnet would position it on the hull to focus a shaped charge capable of making a small hole in the pressure hull. The amount of water entering the submarine in shallow coastal waters was intended to encourage the submarine to surface.

Malin
Malin was similar to Elma, but substituted an acoustic transmitter for the shaped charge to simplify tracking under difficult sonar conditions in coastal waters.

Torpedo
The standard Swedish Torped 42  anti-submarine torpedo warhead was replaced by a smaller explosive charge intended to merely damage submarine propellers or rudders after acoustic homing.

Sources

Non-lethal weapons
Weapons of Sweden